Roland Lee Gift (born 28 May 1961) is a British singer, songwriter and actor. He is the former singer/frontman of the pop band Fine Young Cannibals.

Early life
Gift was born on 28 May 1961 in the Sparkhill district of Birmingham, to an English mother and an Afro-Caribbean father. He lived in Sparkhill until the age of 11, receiving his early formal education at Anderton Park School and Arden Primary School. His family then moved to Kingston upon Hull, where his mother, Pauline, ran several second-hand clothes shops, whilst he was a pupil at Kelvin Hall School.

Music career
Gift's first recording was as a saxophonist with Akrylykz, a ska band from Hull. The album the second release on York's Red Rhino Records. Although this record was unsuccessful, it did bring him to the attention of Andy Cox and David Steele of the Beat. Akrylykz toured with the Beat, which led to them, in around 1985, asking him to be the lead singer of their new band Fine Young Cannibals after their old band, the Beat, had broken up. He also was a guest artist on the Ska City Rockers' "Time Is Tight" single.

In 1990, he was named by People magazine as one of the "50 Most Beautiful People" in the world.

Gift has performed as a solo artist, appearing at the Rewind Festival in Henley. On 13 February 2012, Gift appeared on BBC Radio Solent promoting the gigs and announced a potential new album in 2012. This would be a soundtrack to a film Gift was apparently involved with. "The Prisoner" was played on the show and Gift said this would probably be included in the soundtrack.

He also appeared in Jools Holland's 20th annual Hootenanny show, which aired overnight on BBC2 on 31 December 2012 / 1 January 2013, the last to be recorded at BBC Television Centre. Gift sang the Fine Young Cannibals hits "Good Thing" and "Suspicious Minds".

Gift was a guest vocalist on Jools Holland's 2013 tour.

10 years after his first Hootenanny appearance, Gift re-appeared in Jools Holland's annual Hootenanny show again, which aired overnight on BBC2 on 31 December 2022 / 1 January 2023,. Gift sang the Fine Young Cannibals hits "Suspicious Minds" and "Good Thing".

Acting career

In 1987, Gift had his first screen role in the film Sammy and Rosie Get Laid, and also appeared in Out of Order the same year. In 1990 he did his first stage work, playing Romeo in the Hull Truck Theatre's production of Shakespeare's Romeo and Juliet, a production which had a brief run in the United States at the Staller Center for the Arts. He also appeared as a lounge singer (singing songs that were included in the Fine Young Cannibals' album The Raw and the Cooked) in the 1987 film Tin Men, directed by Barry Levinson.

In 1989, he appeared in Scandal as Johnny Edgecombe, Christine Keeler's boyfriend.

In December 1992, he began the first of five appearances as the evil Immortal Xavier St. Cloud in the television series Highlander: The Series, and appeared in a 1993 episode of the Yorkshire Television series Heartbeat (Ser. 2 Ep 5). He also had a small role as the jazz saxophonist Eddie Mullen in the mini-series Painted Lady (1997), starring Helen Mirren, and appeared in the movie The Island of the Mapmaker's Wife (2001).

In 1997, he appeared in a series of commercials to launch BankDirect, an internet and phone based bank.

In 2020, he starred as Johnny Holloway, an ex-pop star sent to jail, in the BBC Radio 4 musical drama Return to Vegas. Gift wrote the play and co-composed the music together with Ben Barson, brother of Madness's Mike Barson).

Personal life
Gift has three sisters, Helga, Ragna and Jay, and one brother, Paul.

One of Gift's two sons, Louis, was a member of an experimental acrobatic circus company called the 'Barely Methodical Troupe', which staged a public performance at the Edinburgh Fringe Festival in 2016. 

His wife Louise died in 2019.

Discography

Albums

Singles

References

External links

1961 births
Black British rock musicians
Black British male actors
English pop singers
Fine Young Cannibals members
Living people
Musicians from Kingston upon Hull
Musicians from Birmingham, West Midlands
20th-century Black British male singers
English male film actors
English male television actors
English people of West Indian descent
21st-century Black British male singers